Hypatima albogrisea is a moth in the family Gelechiidae. It was described by Walsingham in 1881. It is found in South Africa (KwaZulu-Natal, Mpumalanga).

The wingspan is about 21 mm. The forewings are whitish grey, with a slight pinkish tinge, irrorated with brownish fuscous scales, and with a few single widely scattered steel-blue metallic scales chiefly about the darker markings. A somewhat quadrangular fuscous spot lies scarcely above the middle of the wing, the costa above it slightly shaded. There is a costal blotch of about the same size before the apex, and a smaller spot between the two. Both of the same colour. The apical margin is also narrowly fuscous. The hindwings are cinereous-fuscous, with a narrow semi-transparent steel-blue streak beneath the costal vein, and a tuft of long cinereous-fuscous scales arising from the base of the dorsal vein.

References

Endemic moths of South Africa
Hypatima
Moths described in 1881